Camellia azalea, native to the Ehuangzhang Provincial Nature Reserve in Yangchun City, Guangdong, China, is a national first-class protected plant in China. The Chinese name of Camellia azalea is 杜鹃叶山茶/Rhododendron leaf camellia (dù juān yè shān chá),  because of its rhododendron-like leaf shape. Compared with other camellia species, the flower of Camellia azalea is more like Rhododendron, so it is commonly known as 杜鹃红山茶/Rhododendron red camellia.  It is also commonly known as 四季紅山茶/Four Seasons Red Camellia or 四季茶花/Four Seasons Camellia, because it can flower throughout the year, July-September is the most prosperous period of flowering, which is different from the habit of Camellia flowering in winter. 

It is a small tree or an evergreen shrub, and grows up to 4 meters tall. The plant tends to grow bright red flowers that can be found in clusters of 1 to 5 and of a size of 9-10cm in diameter. Camellia azalea is a Critically Endangered species.

References 

Flora of China
azalea